Gillis R. Wilson III (born October 15, 1977) is a former American football defensive end. He was drafted by the Carolina Panthers in the fifth round of the 2000 NFL Draft. He played college football at Southern University and attended Patterson High School in Patterson, Louisiana.

Wilson was also a member of the New York Giants, Arizona Cardinals, Rhein Fire, Georgia Force, Kansas City Brigade, Grand Rapids Rampage and Dallas Vigilantes.

Professional career
Wilson was drafted by the Carolina Panthers with the 147th pick in the 2000 NFL Draft. He moved to the active roster on December 21, 2000. He was released by the Panthers on August 28, 2001. Wilson was signed to the New York Giants' practice squad on October 4, 2001. He was signed off the Giants' practice squad by the Carolina Panthers on November 20, 2001. He signed with the Arizona Cardinals on July 31, 2002. Wilson was released by the Cardinals on August 26, 2002. He was acquired by the Rhein Fire in the 2003 NFL Europe Free Agent Draft.

He was signed by the Georgia Force on November 26, 2003. Wilson was named Second-team All-Arena in 2005. He was traded to the Kansas City Brigade on March 20, 2006. He was released by the Brigade on February 26, 2007. Wilson signed with the Grand Rapids Rampage on March 1, 2007. He was signed by the Kansas City Brigade on March 6, 2008. He signed with the Dallas Vigilantes on June 8, 2010.

References

External links
Just Sports Stats

Living people
1977 births
American football defensive ends
African-American players of American football
Southern Jaguars football players
Carolina Panthers players
New York Giants players
Arizona Cardinals players
Rhein Fire players
Georgia Force players
Kansas City Brigade players
Grand Rapids Rampage players
Dallas Vigilantes players
Players of American football from Louisiana
People from Patterson, Louisiana
21st-century African-American sportspeople
20th-century African-American sportspeople